Durack may refer to:

People

The Western Australian pioneer family
 Patrick Durack (1834–1898), pastoralist
 Michael Durack (1865–1950), pastoralist, son of Patrick
 Mary Durack (1913–1994), historian, daughter of Michael
 Elizabeth Durack (1915–2000), artist and writer, daughter of Michael
 J. P. Durack (1888–1978), Australian lawyer also known as Roaring Jack Durack or Black Jack Durack
 Peter Durack QC (1926-2008), Rhodes Scholar, lawyer. politician

Other people of that name
 Ernest Durack (1882–1967), politician
 Fanny Durack (1889–1956), swimmer
 Lizzie Durack, footballer
 Lucy Durack (born 1982), performer
 Ray Durack, hurler
 Séamus Durack, hurler

Places
 Durack River
 Durack, Northern Territory
 Durack, Queensland

Other
 Division of Durack, an electoral division in the state of Western Australia

See also 
 Durak